Holbrook N. Todd (February 10, 1906 - August 7, 1972) was an American film editor. Todd was the editor for 172 films and television shows from a career that lasted from 1933 to 1957.

Selected filmography
 Ticket to a Crime (1934)
 Gun Play (1935)
 The Lion's Den (1936)
 Nation Aflame (1937)
 Damaged Goods (1937)
 The Headleys at Home (1938) 
 The Invisible Killer (1939)
The Devil Bat (1940)
 Frontier Crusader (1940)
 Gun Code (1940)
Blonde Comet (1941)
The Mad Monster (1942)
Dead Men Walk (1943)
Harvest Melody (1943)
The Monster Maker (1944)
Thundering Gun Slingers (1944)
 Gas House Kids (1946)
 Outlaws of the Plains (1946)

References

External links

1906 births
1972 deaths
American film editors